Morris Hatalsky (born November 10, 1951) is an American professional golfer.

Early years and amateur career
Hatalsky was born in San Diego, California. He started in golf at age 10, when his older brother bought him a set of junior clubs. As an amateur, he won the 1968 Mexico National Junior Championship. Hatalsky initially attended Arizona State University, where his teammates on the golf team included future PGA Tour and Champions Tour players Bob Gilder, Howard Twitty and Tom Purtzer. He transferred to U.S. International University (now Alliant International University), where he was an NAIA All-American in 1972 and served as team captain.

Professional career
Hatalsky turned professional in 1973. He qualified for the PGA Tour at the 1976 Qualifying School and won four times on Tour between 1981 and 1990. In 2002, he took Rookie of the Year honors in his first season on the Champions Tour, and he was won three events at that level.

Professional wins (7)

PGA Tour wins (4)

PGA Tour playoff record (2–1)

Champions Tour wins (3)

Champions Tour playoff record (0–1)

Results in major championships

CUT = missed the half-way cut
"T" indicates a tie for a place

See also
Spring 1976 PGA Tour Qualifying School graduates
1993 PGA Tour Qualifying School graduates

References

External links

Morris Hatalsky's religious testimony from TheGoal

American male golfers
Arizona State Sun Devils men's golfers
PGA Tour golfers
PGA Tour Champions golfers
Golfers from San Diego
Golfers from Florida
United States International University alumni
Jewish American sportspeople
Converts to Christianity from Judaism
People from Ormond Beach, Florida
People from Ponte Vedra Beach, Florida
1951 births
Living people
21st-century American Jews